12 Mighty Orphans is a 2021 American sports film which was directed by Ty Roberts from a screenplay by Roberts, Lane Garrison and Kevin Meyer. It is based upon the non fiction book Twelve Mighty Orphans: The Inspiring True Story of the Mighty Mites Who Ruled Texas Football by Jim Dent. The book is based on the Masonic School for Orphans in Fort Worth, Texas.

The film stars Luke Wilson, Vinessa Shaw, Wayne Knight, Jake Austin Walker, Jacob Lofland, Levi Dylan, Robert Duvall and Martin Sheen. The film was released in the United States on June 11, 2021 by Sony Pictures Classics. It received mixed reviews from critics.

Plot 

The true story of the Mighty Mites, the football team of a Fort Worth orphanage who, during the Great Depression, went from playing without shoes, or even a football, to playing for the Texas state championships. Over the course of their winning season, these underdogs and their resilient spirit became an inspiration to their city, state, and an entire nation in need of a rebound, even catching the attention of President Franklin D. Roosevelt.

The architect of their success was Rusty Russell, a legendary high school coach who shocked his colleagues by giving up a privileged position so he could teach and coach at an orphanage. Few knew Rusty's secret: that he himself was an orphan. Recognizing that his scrawny players couldn't beat the other teams with brawn, Rusty developed innovative strategies that would come to define modern football.

Cast

Production
Principal photography initially took place for seven weeks from October 7 to November 25, 2019 in Weatherford, Cleburne, and Fort Worth, Texas. It is based on the non fiction book of the same name by Jim Dent. Alice Eve was initially attached to the project early in the development, but dropped out for unknown reasons shortly afterwards.

Release
Sony Pictures Classics acquired worldwide distribution rights to the film in January 2021, five months pending the official release. It was released in a limited release on June 11, 2021 which was followed by a wide expansion one week later on June 18, 2021. The film was released theatrically in the United Kingdom three months later on September 17, 2021.

Reception

Box Office 
In its opening weekend the film made $251,569 from 132 theatres. It expanded to 1,047 theatres the following weekend, making an estimated $870,000 and finishing in eighth place at the box office.

Critical Response 
On the review aggregator website Rotten Tomatoes, the film holds an approval rating of 63% based on 89 reviews with an average rating of 6/10. The site’s critics consensus reads: "12 Mighty Orphans will rouse faithful fans of old fashioned inspirational sports dramas, but the target audience has seen this sort of thing done more effectively before." On Metacritic, the film has a weighted average score of 44 out of 100 based reviews from 14 critics, indicating "mixed or average reviews". Audiences surveyed by PostTrak gave the film an 80% positive score, with 75% saying they would definitely recommend it.

Peter Debruge of Variety called it "Square but satisfying" and said "sometimes they do make ‘em like they used to."

References

External links
 

Sports films based on actual events
Films based on non-fiction books
Films produced by Michael De Luca
Films scored by Mark Orton
American football films
Films shot in Texas
Films shot in Fort Worth, Texas
Sony Pictures Classics films
2020s sports films
2020s English-language films
2020s American films